Tiziana Nisini (born 18 October 1975) is an Italian politician from Lega Nord. She has been State Secretary at the Ministry of Labour and Social Policies since March 2021.

She was a Senator from 2018 to 2021.

References 

Living people
1975 births
Senators of Legislature XVIII of Italy
Draghi Cabinet
21st-century Italian women politicians
Lega Nord politicians
Women government ministers of Italy
20th-century Italian women
Women members of the Senate of the Republic (Italy)